Jiří Malysa (born 14 August 1966 in Opava, Czechoslovakia) is a retired male race walker from Czech Republic, who competed in three consecutive Summer Olympics for his native country, starting in 1996. He participated in the World Championships in Athletics in 2001 and 2003. Over the 20 km road distance, he holds the Czech record of 1:19:18. Although he never won a medal at a major championship, he competed extensively with many appearances at the IAAF World Race Walking Cup and having twice represented his country at the European Athletics Championships.

Achievements

References

1966 births
Living people
Czech male racewalkers
Athletes (track and field) at the 1996 Summer Olympics
Athletes (track and field) at the 2000 Summer Olympics
Athletes (track and field) at the 2004 Summer Olympics
Olympic athletes of the Czech Republic
Sportspeople from Opava